Loren T. Stuckenbruck (born 1960) is an historian of early Christianity and Second Temple Judaism, currently professor of New Testament at the University of Munich, in Germany. His work has exerted a significant impact on the field.

Career
With a B.A. from Milligan College and an M.Div. and Ph.D. from Princeton Theological Seminary, Stuckenbruck taught at the University of Kiel, in Germany, from 1992 to 1994 before moving to the Department of Theology and Religion at Durham University, in the United Kingdom, as B. F. Westcott Chair in Biblical Studies (1994–2009). Beginning in 2009, he served as Richard Dearborn Professor of New Testament Studies at Princeton Theological Seminary. Since 2012, he has held a chair in New Testament with a specialisation in Second Temple Judaism at the University of Munich.

Honors and awards
Early in his career, Stuckenbruck received prestigious grants from the Fulbright Foundation (1986–1988) and the Alexander von Humboldt Foundation (1998). In 2006, he held a fellowship from the British Trust for the Ecumenical Institute at Tantur. Six years later, in 2012, he served as Lady Davis Professor at Hebrew University of Jerusalem.

Professional Activities
Stuckenbruck has sat on numerous editorial boards for international academic journals, including Zeitschrift für die Neutestamentliche Wissenschaft, Journal for the Study of the Pseudepigrapha, Journal of Biblical Literature, New Testament Studies, Henoch, Zeitschrift für die Althebraistik, Dead Sea Discoveries, and Journal for the Study of Judaism. He has also served as editor for a number of different book series, e.g., Themes in Biblical Narrative (Leiden, Brill), Commentaries on Early Jewish Literature (Berlin, Walter De Gruyter), Library of Second Temple Studies (London, Continuum), European Studies on Christian Origins (London, Continuum), and Commentaries on the Dead Sea Scrolls (Oxford, University Press).

Through his scholarly research, Stuckenbruck has pursued interdisciplinary and collaborative work with scholars from the Middle East (Israel, Egypt), Ethiopia, Germany, Denmark, Norway, Netherlands, France, Switzerland, Austria, Canada, Italy, and the United Kingdom.

Areas of Expertise
Published in several books and over 160 articles, Stuckenbruck's research focuses on Second Temple Judaism and Early Christianity. These publications reflect historical, theological, and interdisciplinary interests. In particular, his work centers on the Dead Sea Scrolls, Enoch literature, other Jewish sapiential and apocalyptic writings, and the literature of the New Testament. Themes most commonly addressed in his publications include theological anthropology, the problem of evil, demonology, mental and physical well-being, angelology, eschatology, biblical cosmology, monotheistic belief, origins of Christology, and text-critical editions (esp. Aramaic, Syriac, Hebrew, Greek, Latin, Ethiopic). His writing focuses on evil in the New Testament (the Gospels, Paul, and the Book of Revelation), the Aramaic documents of the Dead Sea Scrolls, a commentary on the Enochic Book of Watchers (Anchor Bible, Yale University Press), canon in the context of Judaism and a broad range of Christian traditions, and on text-critical work on the early Enoch literature preserved primarily in Aramaic, Greek and Ethiopic (Ge'ez).

Selected works

Books
  - Reprinted in 2017 by Baylor University Press (Waco, Texas).
 
 
  - Reprinted in 2017 by Eerdmans (Grand Rapids, Michigan).

Edited by

Articles and Chapters
  (a short commentary).

Translations

Footnotes

External links
 
 Journal for the Study of the Pseudepigrapha website

1960 births
Living people
New Testament scholars
Milligan University alumni
Princeton Theological Seminary alumni
Princeton Theological Seminary faculty
Academic staff of the Ludwig Maximilian University of Munich
Academic journal editors
Academic staff of the University of Kiel
Academics of Durham University